Kasam Khoon Ki is a 1977 Hindi-language action drama film, produced Prasan Kapoor under the Tirupati Pictures banner and directed by Ashok Roy. It stars Jeetendra, Sulakshana Pandit  and music composed by Kalyanji Anandji.

Plot
Seth Dwarkadas a rich, well known, and respected. But no one knew the real Seth Dwarkadas; he traffics women. One day, his wife Shanti discovers this and leaves the house with her children Kishan and Ganga. After twenty years, Kishan will need Rs.25,000/- in less than six months to get his sister married. Kishan decides to re-locate to Bombay and try and earn the money, where he meets with Gafoore Mistry and together they set out to accumulate the money. Kishan then rescues a young woman named Radha from hoodlums and learns from her that her cop brother, Laxman, is imprisoned for a murder he did not commit, and is to be hanged soon. Kishan decides to help her brother, and in order to do this, he gets himself arrested and imprisoned in the same jail as Laxman. Anyway, he is successful in both earning the money and releasing Laxman. When he returns to his village, he learns that his sister Ganga is cheated in love by one of the gang members of Seth Dwaraka Das and she has been included in the trade and had died in saving her honor. Now Kishan decides to take revenge for her sister's death, with the help of his friends, and he destroys his Dwarakadas's gang.

Cast

Jeetendra as  Kishan 
Sulakshana Pandit as Radha
Prem Chopra as Prem
Amjad Khan as Bhajirao
Om Shivpuri as seth Dwarkadas
Madan Puri as Omar Sharif, Sharp Shooter from Dubai
Shakti Kapoor as Johny, Sharp Shooter from Dubai
Roopesh Kumar as sher singh, Sharp Shooter from Dubai
Sujit Kumar as Laxman     
Asrani as  Gafoore Mistry
Nirupa Roy as Shanti
Aruna Irani as Poonam
Farida Jalal as Ganga
Sarla Yeolekar   
Jankidas as Dharamdas
Murad  as Minister  
Vikas Anand as Police Inspector Vikas
Raj Kishore   
Tarun Ghosh  as Chandan Guru     
Asit Sen as Ustad , Prisoner in Jail
M. B. Shetty as Ganja Shetty 
Master Raju as Raju

Soundtrack

External links
 

1977 films
1970s Hindi-language films
Films scored by Kalyanji Anandji